Trupanea mevarna is a species of tephritid or fruit flies in the genus Trupanea of the family Tephritidae.

Distribution
United States, Mexico, Puerto Rico.

References

Tephritinae
Insects described in 1849
Diptera of Africa